Malcolm Douglas Briggs (born 14 September 1961) is an English former professional footballer born in Sunderland who played in the Football League for Birmingham City. When he left school in 1977, he joined Birmingham City as an apprentice, and turned professional two years later. Briggs had not yet established himself as a reserve-team regular when manager Jim Smith unexpectedly named him as substitute for the First Division match away at Manchester City on 1 May 1979. He made his debut coming on to replace Alan Buckley for what turned out to be a three-minute Football League career. He left the club to join Durham City in August 1980.

References

1961 births
Living people
Footballers from Sunderland
English footballers
Association football forwards
Birmingham City F.C. players
Durham City A.F.C. players
English Football League players